This list of moths of Jamaica consists of moths recorded from the island of Jamaica.
Note that this list of moths is incomplete. There is also a list of butterflies of Jamaica.

Moths

Nepticuloidea

Opostegidae
Pseudopostega longifurcata Davis & Stonis, 2007
Pseudopostega mignonae Davis & Stonis, 2007
Pseudopostega saltatrix (Walsingham, 1897)

Tineoidea

Psychidae

Psychinae
Paucivena hispaniolae Davis, 1975
Paucivena reticulata Davis, 1975

Oiketicinae
Oiketicus kirbyi Guilding, 1827

Tineidae

Acrolophinae
Acrolophus illudens Meyrick, 1924
Acrolophus irrisoria Meyrick, 1924

Gracillaroidea

Gracillariidae

Gracillariinae
Dialectica rendalli Walsingham, 1897
Dialectica sanctaecrucis Walsingham, 1897
Macrosaccus gliricidius Davis, 2011
Neurobathra cupreela (Walsingham, 1897)
Phyllocnistis citrella Stainton, 1856

Gelechioidea

Elachistidae

Ethmiinae
Ethmia abraxasella Busck, 1914
Ethmia cubensis Busck, 1934
Ethmia farrella Powell, 1973
Ethmia gelidella (Walker, 1864)
Ethmia humilis Powell, 1973
Ethmia piperella Powell, 1973
Ethmia scythropa Walsingham, 1912
Ethmia submissa Busck, 1914
Ethmia subsimilis Walsingham, 1897

Cosmopterigidae

Cosmopteriginae
Cosmopterix abnormalis Walsingham, 1897
Cosmopterix albicaudis Meyrick, 1932
Cosmopterix argentifera Koster, 2010
Cosmopterix astrapias Walsingham, 1909
Cosmopterix attenuatella (Walker, 1864)
Cosmopterix ebriola Hodges, 1962
Cosmopterix floridanella Beutenmüller, 1889
Cosmopterix interfracta Meyrick, 1922
Cosmopterix irrubricata Walsingham, 1909
Cosmopterix teligera Meyrick, 1915
Pebobs elara Koster, 2010

Pterophoroidea

Pterophoridae

Pterophorinae
Exelastis montischristi (Walsingham, 1897)
Exelastis pumilio (Zeller, 1873)

Choreutoidea

Choreutidae

Choreutinae
Brenthia confluxana (Walker, 1863)

Tortricoidea

Tortricidae

Olethreutinae
Ethelgoda texanana (Walsingham, 1879)

Tortricinae
Aethes olibra Razowski, 1994
Argyrotaenia jamaicana Razowski & Becker, 2000
Argyrotaenia minisignaria chalarostium Razowski & Becker, 2000

Cossoidea

Cossidae

Cossinae
Cossula morgani Clench, 1957
Voousia punctifer Hampson, 1898

Zeuzerinae
Psychonoctua personalis Grote, 1865

Zygaenoidea

Limacodidae
Alarodia nana Möeschler, 1886

Dalceridae
Acraga ciliata Walker, 1855

Hyblaeidae
Hyblaea puera (Cramer, 1777)

Hyblaeoidea

Hedylidae
Macrosoma stabilinota Prout, 1932

Pyraloidea

Pyralidae
Carcha hersilialis Walker, 1859
Epitamyra thermalis Hampson, 1906
Galasa rubidana Walker, 1866
Megacaphys titana Schaus, 1904
Parachmidia fervidalis Walker, 1866
Salobrena recurvata (Möschler, 1886)
Salobrena vacuana (Walker, 1863)

Galleriinae
Epimorius testaceellus Ragonot, 1887
Galleria mellonella (Linnaeus, 1758)

Epipaschiinae
Dasyvesica lophotalis Hampson, 1906
Deuterollyta claudalis Möeschler, 1886
Deuterollyta majuscula (Herrich-Schäffer, 1871)
Macalla phaeobasalis Hampson, 1916
Pococera polialis Hampson, 1906
Tallula atramentalis (Lederer, 1863)
Tineopaschia minuta Hampson, 1916

Phycitinae
Anabasis ochrodesma (Zeller, 1881)
Ancylostomia stercorea (Zeller, 1848)
Anypsipyla univitella Dyar, 1914
Cabotia bonhoti Hampson, 1901
Caristanius pellucidella (Ragonot, 1889)
Crocidomera turbidella Zeller, 1848
Ectomyelois ceratoniae (Zeller, 1839)
Ectomyelois decolor (Zeller, 1881)
Elasmopalpus lignosellus (Zeller, 1848)
Ephestia kuehniella Zeller, 1879
Ephestiodes stictella Hampson, 1901
Etiella zinckenella (Treitschke, 1832)
Fundella argentina Dyar, 1919
Hypsipyla grandella (Zeller, 1848)
Nonia exiguella Ragonot, 1888
Ozamia lucidalis (Walker, 1863)
Phestinia costella Hampson, 1930
Plodia interpunctella (Hübner, [1810–13])
Stylopalpia lunigerella Hampson, 1901
Ufa rubedinella (Zeller, 1848)

Pyralinae
Luma albifascialis Hampson, 1897
Mapeta xanthomelas Walker, 1863
Megastes brunnealis Hampson, 1913
Nomophila nearctica Munroe, 1973
Steniodes gelliasalis Walker, 1859

Scopariinae
Himantoides perkinsae Clark, 1933
Himantoides undata Walker, 1856
Scoparia atricuprea Hampson, 1917

Crambidae

Crambinae
Argyria vestalis Butler, 1878
Crambus coccophthorus Bleszynski, 1962
Diatraea saccharalis (Fabricius, 1794)
Donacoscaptes micralis Hampson, 1919
Fissicrambus curtellus Walker, 1863
Fissicrambus profanellus (Walker, 1866)
Mesolia jamaicensis Hampson, 1919
Microcausta argenticilia Hampson, 1919
Microcrambus atristrigellus (Hampson, 1919)
Parapediasia ligonella (Zeller, 1881)
Pediasia luteolella Hulst, 1886
Prionapteryx eugraphis Walker, 1863

Glaphyriinae
Chalcoela pegasalis (Walker, [1866])
Dicymolomia metalophota (Hampson, 1897)
Glaphyria badierana (Fabricius, 1794)
Glaphyria decisa (Walker, [1866])
Glaphyria pupillalis Möeschler, 1886
Hellula phidilealis (Walker, 1859)
Stegea jamaicensis Munroe, 1964

Dichogaminae
Alatuncusia bergii (Möschler, 1890)
Dichogama decoralis (Walker, 1865)
Dichogama innocus (Fabricius, 1793)
Dichogama redtenbacheri Lederer, 1863

Musotiminae
Barisoa intentalis Möeschler, 1886
Neurophyseta rufalis Hampson, 1912
Undulambia albitessellalis (Hampson, 1906)
Undulambia grisealis Hampson, 1906
Undulambia leucocymalis Hampson, 1906
Undulambia oedizonalis Hampson, 1906
Undulambia phaeochroalis Hampson, 1906

Acentropinae
Neargyractis fulvicinctalis Hampson, 1897
Neargyractis moniligeralis Lederer, 1863
Petrophila albulalis (Hampson, 1906)

Odontiinae
Basonga paradisalis Möeschler, 1886
Cliniodes cyllarusalis Druce, 1895
Cliniodes euphrosinalis (Möschler, 1896)
Cliniodes opalalis Guenée, 1854
Cliniodes underwoodi H. Druce, 1899
Microtheoris ophionalis (Walker, 1859)
Mimoschinia rufofascialis (Stephens, 1834)

Evergestinae
Evergestella evincalis (Möschler, 1890)
Evergestis rimosalis Guenée, 1854
Symphysa discalis Hampson, 1912
Trischistognatha pyrenealis (Walker, 1859)

Pyraustinae
Achyra bifidalis (Fabricius, 1794)
Achyra rantalis (Guenée, 1854)
Agathodes designalis Guenée, 1854
Apogeshna infirmalis (Möschler, 1886)
Sisyracera subulalis (Guenée, 1854)
Arthromastix lauralis (Walker, 1859)
Asciodes gordialis Guenée, 1854
Asciodes scopulalis Guenée, 1854
Asturodes fimbriauralis (Guenée, 1854)
Ategumia ebulealis (Guenée, 1854)
Ategumia matutinalis (Guenée, 1854)
Bicilia iarchasalis (Walker, 1859)
Bicilia lentistrialis Dognin, 1906
Bicilia olivia Butler, 1875
Blepharomastix achroalis (Hampson, 1913)
Blepharomastix branealis Schaus, 1924
Bradina hemmingalis Schaus, 1940
Bradina purpurascens Hampson, 1907
Coenostolopsis apicalis (Lederer, 1863)
Conchylodes diphteralis (Geyer, 1832)
Cryptobotys zoilusalis (Walker, 1859)
Cyclocena lelex (Cramer, 1777)
Desmia ceresalis (Walker, 1859)
Desmia deploralis Hampson, 1912
Desmia ploralis (Guenée, 1854)
Desmia tages (Cramer, 1777)
Desmia ufeus (Cramer, 1777)
Deuterophysa micralis Hampson, 1907
Deuterophysa sanguiflualis Hampson, 1913
Diacme mopsalis (Walker, 1859)
Diacme phyllisalis (Walker, 1859)
Diaphania attigua E. Hering, 1906
Diaphania costata (Fabricius, 1794)
Diaphania elegans (Möschler, 1890)
Diaphania fuscicaudalis (Möschler, 1881)
Diaphania hyalinata (Linnaeus, 1767)
Diaphania nitidalis (Cramer, 1781)
Diasemiopsis leodocusalis (Walker, 1859)
Epicorsia oedipodalis (Guenée, 1854)
Epipagis zinghalis Walker, 1859
Ercta vittata (Fabricius, 1794)
Eulepte gastralis (Guenée, 1854)
Eulepte inguinalis (Guenée, 1854)
Glyphodes heliconialis Guenée, 1854
Glyphodes sibillalis Walker, 1859
Herpetogramma agavealis Walker, 1859
Herpetogramma bipunctalis (Fabricius, 1794)
Herpetogramma infuscalis (Guenée, 1854)
Herpetogramma phaeopteralis (Guenée, 1854)
Hileithia magualis (Guenée, 1854)
Hileithia terminalis Hampson, 1912
Hymenia perspectalis (Hübner, 1796)
Lamprosema oxiperalis Hampson, 1912
Leucochroma jamaicensis Hampson, 1912
Lineodes fontella Walsingham, 1913
Loxomorpha cambogialis (Guenée, 1854)
Lygropia tripunctata (Fabricius, 1794)
Maruca vitrata (Fabricius, 1787)
Microphysetica hermeasalis (Walker, 1859)
Microthyris anormalis (Guenée, 1854)
Microthyris prolongalis (Guenée, 1854)
Mimorista brunneoflavalis Hampson, 1913
Mimorista diopalis Hampson, 1913
Mimorista jamaicalis Haimbach, 1915
Mimorista matronulalis Möeschler, 1886
Mimorista villicalis Möeschler, 1886
Neohelvibotys neohelvialis (Capps, 1967)
Neoleucinodes elegantalis (Guenée, 1854)
Neoleucinodes torvis Capps, 1948
Oenobotys vinotinctalis (Hampson, 1895)
Omiodes indicata (Fabricius, 1775)
Omiodes xanthodysana Dyar, 1914
Ommatospila narcaeusalis (Walker, 1859)
Ostrinia penitalis (Hampson, 1913)
Palpita flegia (Cramer, 1777)
Palpita punctalis Warren, 1896
Palpusia glaucusalis Walker, 1859
Penestola bufalis (Guenée, 1854)
Phaedropsis collustralis Möeschler, 1886
Phaedropsis meropialis Möeschler, 1886
Phaedropsis principialis Lederer, 1863
Phostria tedea Cramer, 1782
Pilocrocis hypoleucalis Hampson, 1912
Pilocrocis monothyralis Hampson, 1912
Pilocrocis reniferalis Hampson, 1912
Pleuroptya silicalis (Guenée, 1854)
Polygrammodes elevata (Fabricius, 1794)
Polygrammodes ostrealis (Guenée, 1854)
Portentomorpha xanthialis (Guenée, 1854)
Prenesta ignefactalis Möeschler, 1886
Prenesta ornamentalis Möeschler, 1881
Prenesta philinoralis Walker, 1859
Prenesta prosopealis Walker, 1859
Psara dryalis (Walker, 1859)
Psara pertentalis Möschler, 1890
Pseudopyrausta acutangulalis (Snellen, 1875)
Pseudopyrausta minima von Hedemann
Pyrausta insignitalis (Guenée, 1854)
Pyrausta phoenicealis (Walker, 1859)
Pyrausta carnifex Felder & Rogenhofer, 1874
Pyrausta tyralis (Guenée, 1854)
Rhectocraspeda periusalis (Walker, 1859)
Salbia cassidalis Guenée, 1854
Salbia haemorrhoidalis Guenée, 1854
Salbia tytiusalis Walker, 1859
Samea carettalis Schaus, 1940
Samea ecclesialis Guenée, 1854
Sathria simmialis Walker, 1859
Sisyracera contortilinealis Hampson, 1895
Sisyracera subulalis (Guenée, 1854)
Sparagmia gonoptera Munroe, 1958
Spoladea recurvalis (Fabricius, 1775)
Steniodes mendica (Hedemann, 1894)
Syllepis marialis Poey, 1832
Syllepte belialis (Walker, 1859)
Synclera chlorophasma Butler, 1878
Syngamia florella (Cramer, 1781)
Terastia meticulosalis Guenée, 1854
Triuncidia eupalusalis (Walker, 1859)
Udea secernalis (Möschler, 1890)
Uresiphita reversalis (Guenée, 1854)
Zenamorpha discophoralis (Hampson, 1899)

Bombycoidea

Saturniidae
Samia cynthia Drury, 1773

Sphingidae

Macroglossinae
Aellopos blaini Herrich-Schäffer, [1869]
Aellopos clavipes (Rothschild & Jordan, 1903)
Aellopos fadus (Cramer, 1775)
Aellopos tantalus (Drury, 1773)
Callionima falcifera Gehlen, 1943
Cautethia grotei Edwards, 1882
Enyo lugubris (Linnaeus, 1771)
Enyo ocypete (Linnaeus, 1758)
Erinnyis alope (Drury, 1773)
Erinnyis crameri (Schaus, 1898)
Erinnyis domingonis Butler, 1875
Erinnyis ello (Linnaeus, 1758)
Erinnyis guttularis (Walker, 1856)
Erinnyis lassauxii (Boisduval, 1859)
Erinnyis obscura (Fabricius, 1775)
Erinnyis oenotrus (Cramer, 1780)
Eumorpha fasciatus (Sulzer, 1776)
Eumorpha labruscae (Linnaeus, 1758)
Eumorpha satellitia (Grote, 1865)
Eumorpha vitis (Linnaeus, 1758)
Hyles lineata (Fabricius, 1775)
Isognathus rimosa (Grote, 1865)
Madoryx oiclus (Cramer, [1780])
Pachylia ficus (Linnaeus, 1758)
Pachylia syces Hübner, [1819]
Pachylioides resumens (Walker, 1856)
Perigonia jamaicensis Butler, 1877
Phryxus caicus (Cramer, 1777)
Pseudosphinx tetrio (Linnaeus, 1771)
Xylophanes chiron Rothschild & Jordan, 1906
Xylophanes jamaicensis Clark, 1935
Xylophanes maculator Boisduval, 1875
Xylophanes pluto (Fabricius, 1777)
Xylophanes tersa (Linnaeus, 1771)

Sphinginae
Adhemarius gannascus Stoll, 1790
Agrius cingulata (Fabricius, 1775)
Cocytius antaeus (Drury, 1773)
Cocytius duponchel (Poey, 1832)
Manduca brontes (Grote, 1865)
Manduca rustica (Wood, 1915)
Manduca sexta (Butler, 1875)
Nannoparce poeyi (Grote, 1865)
Neococytius cluentius (Cramer, 1775)
Protambulyx strigilis (Linnaeus, 1771)

Uraniidae

Erosia incongua Butler, 1878
Urania poeyi (Herrich-Schäffer, 1868)
Urania sloanus Cramer, 1874

Sematuridae

Mania aegisthus (Fabricius, 1781)

Geometridae

Oenochrominae
Ametris nitocris (Cramer, 1780)
Ergavia subrufa Warren, 1897
Zanclopteryx uniferata Walker, 1863

Ennominae
Epimecis detexta (Walker, 1860)
Epimecis scolopaiae (Drury, 1773)
Erastria decrepitaria (Hübner, [1823])
Erosina hyberniata Guenée, [1858]
Hydatoscia ategua (Druce, 1892)
Iridopsis vicaria Walker, 1860
Psamatodes doriteata Guenée, 1858
Macaria nervata Guenée, 1858
Melanochroia chephise (Stoll, 1782)
Melanochroia venata Rindge, 1961
Melanolophia mutabilis (Warren, 1897)
Nepheloleuca politia (Guenée, [1858])
Numia terebintharia Guenée, [1858]
Oenoptila nigrilineata Warren, 1897
Oxydia olivacea (Warren, 1895)
Oxydia vesulia (Walker, 1860)
Patalene epionata (Guenée, [1858])
Patalene falcularia Sepp, 1852
Patalene nutriaria Walker, 1860
Patalene sordida Warren, 1906
Perissopteryx ochrilinea Warren, 1904
Pero bicolor Warren, 1895
Pero variaria Walker, 1860
Phrygionis argentata Drury, 1773
Phrygionis paradoxata (Guenée, 1857)
Phrygionis platinata (Guenée, 1858)
Phrygionis sumptuosaria Möeschler, 1886
Prochoerodes tetragonata Guenée, 1858
Prochoerodes transtincta Walker, 1860
Psamatodes abydata (Guenée, 1855)
Psamatodes everiata (Guenée, [1858])
Psamatodes nicetaria (Guenée, 1858)
Sabulodes mucronis Rindge, 1978
Semiothisa paleolata (Guenée, 1858)
Sericoptera flavifimbria Walker, 1860
Sphacelodes vulneraria (Hübner, 1823)
Thyrinteina unicornis Rindge, 1961

Geometrinae
Chloropteryx paularia (Möschler, 1886)
Dichorda rhodocephala Prout, 1916
Eueana niveociliaria (Herrich-Schäffer, 1870)
Oospila confundaria (Möschler, 1890)
Oospila decoloraria (Walker, 1861)
Phrudocentra centrifugaria (Herrich-Schäffer, 1870)
Phrudocentra kinstonensis Butler, 1878
Synchlora ephippiaria Möeschler
Synchlora frondaria Guenée, [1858]
Synchlora herbaria (Fabricius, 1794)

Sterrhinae
Acratodes phakellurata Guenée, 1858
Cyclophora caducaria Möeschler, 1886
Cyclophora conferta Warren, 1900
Cyclophora lichenea Warren, 1900
Cyclophora nanaria (Walker, 1861)
Cyclophora ordinata Walker, 1862
Cyclophora subpallida Warren, 1900
Cyclophora urcearia Guenée, [1858]
Euacidalia orbelia Druce, 1893
Leptostales oblinataria (Möschler, 1890)
Leptostales phorcaria (Guenée, [1858])
Leptostales roseoliva Warren, 1900
Leptostales virgota Schaus, 1901
Lobocleta tenellata Möschler, 1886
Pleuroprucha asthenaria (Walker, 1861)
Scopula apparitaria (Walker, 1861)
Scopula subquadrata (Guenée, [1858])
Scopula umbilicata (Fabricius, 1794)
Semaeopus argocosma Prout, 1935
Semaeopus callichroa Prout, 1938
Semaeopus castaria (Guenée, [1858])
Semaeopus decalvaria Möeschler, 1886
Semaeopus indignaria (Guenée, 1858)

Larentiinae
Disclisioprocta stellata (Guenée, [1858])
Dyspteris abortivaria (Herrich-Schäffer, [1855])
Dyspteris trichophora Herbulot, 1988
Eois decursaria Möeschler, 1886
Eois snellenaria Möschler, 1892
Eois tessellata Warren, 1897
Eois trinotata Warren, 1895
Euphyia floridata Walker, 1863
Euphyia perturbata (Walker, 1862)
Eupithecia succernata Möschler, 1886
Eupithecia sucidata Möeschler, 1886
Hammaptera parinotata (Zeller, 1872)
Obila catocalaria Walker, 1866
Obila pannosata (Guenée, [1858])
Spargania dulciferata Walker, 1862
Triphosa affirmata (Guenée, [1858])

Noctuoidea

Notodontidae

Notodontinae
Disphragis cervina Möeschler, 1886
Disphragis jamaicensis Schaus, 1901

Dudusinae
Crinodes besckei Hübner, 1824

Heterocampinae
Boriza eglossa Kaye, 1925
Malocampa punctata (Cramer, 1782)
Rifargia distinguenda (Walker, 1856)

Nystaleinae
Hippia insularis (Grote, 1866)
Nystalea collaris Schaus, 1910
Nystalea ebalea (Stoll, 1779)
Nystalea indiana Grote, 1884
Nystalea nyseus (Cramer, [1775])

Erebidae

Arctiinae
Aethria dorsolineata Hampson, 1898
Ammalo helops (Cramer, 1775)
Calidota strigosa (Walker, 1855)
Carathis palpalis (Walker, 1855)
Composia credula (Fabiricius, 1775)
Cosmosoma achemon (Fabricius, 1781)
Cosmosoma auge (Linnaeus, 1767)
Cosmosoma fenestrata (Drury, 1773)
Ctenuchidia fulvibasis Hering, 1925
Ctenuchidia virgo (Herrich-Schäffer, [1855])
Elysius cingulata (Walker, 1856)
Empyreuma anassa Forbes, 1917
Eucereon coenobita Möeschler, 1806)
Eucereon moeschleri (Rothschild, 1912)
Eucereon ochrota Hampson, 1905
Eunomia rubripunctata (Butler, 1876)
Eupseudosoma involuta (Sepp, [1855])
Halysidota elota Möeschler, 1886
Horama grotei Butler, 1876
Horama panthalon (Fabricius, 1793)
Hyalurga halizoa (Druce, 1907)
Hyalurga vinosa (Drury, 1773)
Hypercompe nigriplaga (Walker, 1855)
Hypercompe persola (Möeschler, 1886)
Idalus delicata Möeschler, 1886
Ischnocampa griseola Rothschild, 1909
Leucanopsis moeschleri (Rothschild, 1909)
Lophocampa atomosa (Walker, 1855)
Lymire melanocephala Walker, 1854
Mulona grisea Hampson, 1900
Nyridela chalciope (Hübner, [1831])
Opharus bimaculata (Dewitz, 1877)
Pachydota iodea (Herrich-Schäffer, 1855)
Pareuchaetes insulata (Walker, 1855)
Philoros quadricolor (Walker, 1866)
Phoenicoprocta jamaicensis (Schaus, 1901)
Pseudocharis minima (Grote, 1867)
Symphlebia jamaicensis (Schaus, 1896)
Syntomidopsis variegata (Walker, 1854)
Uranophora chalybaea Hübner, [1831]
Utetheisa ornatrix (Linnaeus, 1758)

Ctenuchiinae
Correbia lycoides (Walker, 1854)
Cyanopepla fastuosa (Walker, 1854)
Gymnelia dubia Rothschild, 1911
Nyridela xanthocera (Walker, 1856)
Uraga haemorrhoa Walker, 1854

Pericopinae
Are druryi Watson & Goodger, 1984
Stenognatha toddi Lane & Watson, 1975

Lithosiinae
Cincia conspersa Walker, 1854
Cincia sordida (Möeschler, 1886)
Parvicincia belli Field (no date)
Paracincia butleri Field (no date)
Paracincia dognini Field (no date)
Amplicincia mixta (Möeschler, 1886)
Amplicincia pallida (Butler, 1878)
Amplicincia fletcheri Field, 1950
Amplicincia lathyi Field, 1950
Amplicincia walkeri Field, 1950

Herminiinae
Berocynta simplex Möeschler, 1886
Bleptina caradrinalis Guenée, 1854
Bleptina menalcasalis Walker, [1859]
Carteris oculatalis (Möschler, 1890)
Diplodira jamaicalis Schaus, 1916
Lascoria alucitalis (Guenée, 1854)
Lascoria orneodalis (Guenée, 1854)
Mastigophorus jamaicalis Möschler, 1890
Palthis asopialis (Guenée, 1854)
Phlyctaina irrigualis Möschler, 1890
Physula albipunctilla Schaus, 1916
Scopifera mirabilis Walker, 1858
Tetanolita mutatalis (Möschler, 1890)

Hypeninae
Ballonicha recurvata Möeschler, 1886
Hypena abjuralis Walker, 1858
Hypena androna (Druce, 1890)
Hypena exoletalis Guenée, 1854
Hypena leniusculalis Möeschler, 1886
Hypena lunifera Butler, 1878
Hypena minualis Guenée, 1854
Hypena porrectalis (Fabricius, 1794)
Hypena subidalis Guenée, 1854
Hypena vetustalis Guenée, 1854

Scoliopteryginae
Anomis editrix (Guenée, 1852)
Anomis erosa Hübner, 1821
Anomis illita Guenée, 1852
Anomis impasta Guenée, 1852

Calpinae
Acanthodica emittens Walker, 1857
Dialithis gemmifera Hübner, [1821]
Gonodonta clotilda (Stoll, 1790)
Gonodonta incurva (Sepp, [1840])
Gonodonta jamaicensis Barbut & Lalanne-Cassou, 2009
Gonodonta nitidimacula Guenée, 1852
Gonodonta nutrix (Stoll, 1780)
Gonodonta sicheas (Cramer, 1777)
Gonodonta uxor (Cramer, 1780)
Plusiodonta thomae Guenée, 1852

Hypocalinae
Hypocala andremona (Stoll, 1781)

Boletobiinae
Metalectra analis Schaus, 1916

Eublemminae
Eublemma cinnamomea (Herrich-Schäffer, 1868)
Eublemma recta (Guenée, 1852)

Phytometrinae
Aglaonice hirtipalpis Walker, 1859
Aglaonice otignatha Hampson, 1924
Hemeroplanis scopulepes (Haworth, 1809)
Isogona scindens (Walker, 1858)
Mursa phtisialis (Guenée, 1854)
Mursa subrufa (Warren, 1889)

Erebinae
Achaea ablunaris (Guenée, 1852)
Argidia palmipes Guenée, 1852
Argidia penicillata Möeschler, 1886
Ascalapha odorata (Linnaeus, 1758)
Calyptis iter Guenée, 1852
Casandria ferrocana (Walker, 1857)
Celiptera cometophora Hampson, 1913
Celiptera levina (Stoll, 1782)
Coenipeta bibitrix (Hübner, 1823)
Coenipeta diffusa Walker, 1857
Elousa albicans Walker, [1858]
Epidromia poaphiloides Guenée, 1852
Epidromia suffusa Walker, 1858
Epidromia zetophora Guenée, 1852
Euclystis angularis (Möschler, 1886)
Gonodontodes chionosticta Hampson, 1913
Hemeroblemma numeria (Drury, [1773])
Hemeroblemma opigena (Drury, 1773)
Kakopoda progenies (Guenée, 1852)
Lesmone formularis (Zeller, 1837)
Letis hercyna Drury, 1773
Letis specularis Hübner, 1821
Melipotis acontioides (Guenée, 1852)
Melipotis agrotoides Walker, 1857
Melipotis brunnearis Guenée, 1852
Melipotis famelica (Guenée, 1852)
Melipotis fasciolaris (Hübner, [1831])
Melipotis januaris (Guenée, 1852)
Melipotis limitata Möeschler, 1886
Melipotis novanda Guenée, 1852
Melipotis ochrodes (Guenée, 1852)
Melipotis perpendicularis (Guenée, 1852)
Metria irresoluta (Walker, 1858)
Mocis diffluens (Guenée, 1852)
Mocis disseverans (Walker, 1858)
Ophisma tropicalis Guenée, 1852
Panula inconstans Guenée, 1852
Perasia garnoti (Guenée, 1852)
Ptichodis herbarum Guenée, 1852
Ptichodis immunis (Guenée, 1852)
Selenisa sueroides (Guenée, 1852)
Thysania zenobia (Cramer, 1777)
Tricentrogyna vinacea Butler, 1878
Trigonodes lucasii Guenée, 1852
Zale fictilis (Guenée, 1852)
Zale lunata (Drury, [1773])
Zale plumbeolinea Hampson, 1918
Zale rufosa Hampson, 1913
Zale strigimacula (Guenée, 1852)

Eulepidotinae
Antiblemma bistriga Möeschler, 1886
Antiblemma calida Butler, 1878
Antiblemma nannodes Hampson, 1926
Antiblemma rufinans (Guenée, 1852)
Anticarsia gemmatalis Hübner, 1818
Azeta quassa Walker, 1858
Azeta repugnalis (Hübner, 1825)
Azeta versicolor (Fabricius, 1794)
Azeta uncas Guenée, 1852
Dyomyx inferior (Herrich-Schäffer, 1869)
Epitausa coppryi (Guenée, 1852)
Eulepidotis addens (Walker, 1858)
Eulepidotis merricki (Holland, 1902)
Eulepidotis metamorpha Dyar, 1914
Eulepidotis modestula (Herrich-Schäffer, 1869)
Eulepidotis perducens Walker, 1858
Eulepidotis persimilis Guenée, 1852
Massala obvertens (Walker, 1858)
Syllectra erycata (Cramer, 1780)

Euteliidae

Euteliinae
Eutelia ablatrix (Guenée, 1852)
Eutelia caustiplaga Hampson, 1905
Eutelia furcata (Walker, 1865)
Paectes elegans Möeschler, 1890
Paectes fuscescens Walker, 1855
Paectes lunodes (Guenée, 1852)
Paectes obrotunda (Guenée, 1852)
Paectes pallida Möeschler, 1886
Palpidia melanotricha Hampson

Stictopterinae
Nagara vitrea (Guenée, 1852)

Nolidae

Chloephorinae
Iscadia aperta Walker, 1857
Iscadia metaphaea Hampson, 1918
Iscadia mollis Möeschler, 1886

Collomeninae
Concana mundissima Walker, [1858]

Afridinae
Afrida mesomelaena Hampson
Afrida tortriciformis Möeschler

Noctuidae

Plusiinae
Argyrogramma verruca (Fabricius, 1794)
Autoplusia illustrata (Guenée, 1852)
Chrysodeixis includens (Walker, [1858])
Ctenoplusia oxygramma (Geyer, 1832)
Megalographa biloba Stephens, 1830
Mouralia tinctoides (Guenée, 1852)
Plusia calceolaris Walker, 1857
Rachiplusia ou (Guenée, 1852)
Trichoplusia ni (Hübner, [1803])

Bagisarinae
Amyna axis (Guenée, 1852)
Bagisara repanda (Fabricius, 1793)

Cydosiinae
Cydosia nobilitella (Cramer, [1780])

Hadeninae
Cephalospargeta elongata Möschler, 1890

Acontiinae
Spragueia apicalis (Herrich-Schäffer, 1868)
Spragueia dama (Guenée, 1852)
Spragueia margana (Fabricius, 1794)
Spragueia perstructana (Walker, 1865)
Tarache tetragona (Walker, [1858])

Diphtherinae
Diphthera festiva (Fabricius, 1775)

Amphipyrinae
Araeopteron acidalica Hampson, 1910
Archanara oblonga Grote, 1882
Argyrosticta ditissima Walker, 1857
Cropia indigna (Walker, [1858])
Cropia infusa (Walker, [1858])
Cropia minthe Dyar, 1889
Cropia subapicalis (Walker, 1858)
Galgula subapicalis Hampson, 1909
Heterochroma berylloides Hampson, 1908
Heterochroma insignis Walker, 1857
Lithacodia glauca Hampson, 1910
Macapta albivitta Hampson, 1910
Thioptera aurifera Walker, 1858

Oncocnemidinae
Antachara diminuta (Guenée, 1852)
Neogalea sunia (Guenée, 1852)

Agaristinae
Caularis jamaicensis Todd, 1966
Caularis undulans (Walker, [1858])
Euscirrhopterus poeyi Grote, 1866

Condicinae
Condica abida Felder & Rogenhofer, 1874
Condica albigera (Guenée, 1852)
Condica circuita (Guenée, 1852)
Condica concisa (Walker, 1856)
Condica confederata (Grote, 1873)
Condica cupentia (Cramer, 1780)
Condica mobilis (Walker, [1857])
Condica punctifera (Walker, [1857])
Condica selenosa Guenée, 1852
Condica subornata Walker, 1865
Condica sutor (Guenée, 1852)
Micrathetis dasarada (Druce, 1898)
Micrathetis triplex (Walker, 1857)
Perigea punctirena Walker, 1857
Perigea xanthioides Guenée, 1852

Heliothinae
Helicoverpa zea (Boddie, 1850)
Heliothis lucilinea Walker, 1858
Heliothis virescens (Fabricius, 1777)

Eriopinae
Callopistria jamaicensis (Möschler, 1886)

Noctuinae
Acroria terens (Walker, 1857)
Agrotis malefida Guenée, 1852
Agrotis repleta Walker, 1857
Anicla infecta (Ochsenheimer, 1816)
Barcita subviridescens Walker, 1858
Boryzops purissima Dyar, 1910
Bryolymnia floccifera Möeschler, 1886
Elaphria agrotina (Guenée, 1852)
Elaphria basistigma Walker, 1858
Elaphria chalcedonia (Hübner, 1803)
Elaphria deltoides (Möschler, 1880)
Elaphria devara (Druce, 1898)
Elaphria nucicolora (Guenée, 1852)
Elaphria subobliqua (Walker, 1858)
Eriopyga crista Walker, 1856
Feltia subterranea (Fabricius, 1794)
Galgula partita Guenée, 1852
Gonodes liquida (Möschler, 1886)
Lacinipolia distributa (Möschler, 1886)
Leucania chejela (Schaus, 1921)
Leucania clarescens Möschler, 1890
Leucania dorsalis Walker, 1856
Leucania educata Adams, 2001
Leucania humidicola Guenée, 1852
Leucania incognita (Barnes & McDunnough, 1918)
Leucania inconspicua Herrich-Schäffer, 1868
Leucania latiuscula Herrich-Schäffer, 1868
Leucania lobrega Adams, 2001
Leucania rawlinsi Adams, 2001
Leucania secta Herrich-Schäffer, 1868
Leucania senescens Möschler, 1890
Magusa orbifera (Walker, 1857)
Mamestra soligena Möschler, 1886
Marilopteryx lamptera (Druce, 1890)
Mythimna sequax (Franclemont, 1951)
Mythimna unipuncta (Haworth, 1809)
Neophaenis meterythra Hampson, 1908
Neophaenis respondens (Walker, 1858)
Orthodes jamaicensis Hampson, 1905
Orthodes vesquesa (Dyar, 1913)
Peridroma saucia (Hübner, [1808])
Pseudyrias dufayi Schaus, 1933
Spodoptera albula (Walker, 1859)
Spodoptera androgea (Stoll, 1782)
Spodoptera dolichos (Fabricius, 1794)
Spodoptera eridania (Stoll, 1782)
Spodoptera frugiperda (Smith, 1797)
Spodoptera latifascia (Walker, 1856)
Spodoptera ornithogalli (Guenée, 1852)
Spodoptera pulchella (Herrich-Schäffer, 1868)
Tiracola grandirena (Herrich-Schäffer, 1868)
Xanthopastis regnatrix (Grote, 1863)

References
Checklist of the Lepidoptera of the Antilles
Moths of Jamaica

 M
Lepidoptera
Jamaica
Jamaica
Jamaica, Moths
Jamaica, Moths